Djoos is a Swedish surname. Notable people with the surname include:

Christian Djoos (born 1994), Swedish ice hockey defenceman
Pär Djoos (born 1968), Swedish ice hockey defenceman, father of Christian

Swedish-language surnames